Oliver Seth (May 30, 1915 – March 27, 1996) was a United States circuit judge of the United States Court of Appeals for the Tenth Circuit.

Education and career

Born in Albuquerque, New Mexico, Seth received a Bachelor of Arts degree from Stanford University in 1937. He received a Bachelor of Laws from Yale Law School in 1940. He was in private practice of law in Santa Fe, New Mexico in 1940. He was a United States Army Major from 1940 to 1946. He returned to private practice in Santa Fe from 1946 to 1962. He was a Government Appeal Agent for the Selective Service System from 1948 to 1952.

Federal judicial service

Seth was nominated by President John F. Kennedy on May 24, 1962, to a seat on the United States Court of Appeals for the Tenth Circuit vacated by Judge Sam G. Bratton. He was confirmed by the United States Senate on June 11, 1962, and received his commission on June 20, 1962. He served as Chief Judge from 1977 to 1984. He assumed senior status on December 25, 1984. His service was terminated on March 27, 1996, due to his death.

References

Sources

External Links

1915 births
1996 deaths
Judges of the United States Court of Appeals for the Tenth Circuit
United States court of appeals judges appointed by John F. Kennedy
20th-century American judges
United States Army officers
People from Albuquerque, New Mexico
Stanford University alumni
Yale Law School alumni